Archville may refer to:

 Archville, New South Wales
 Archville, New York